Mangelia branneri is an extinct species of sea snail, a marine gastropod mollusk in the family Mangeliidae.

Description
The length of the shell attains 10 mm, its diameter 4 mm.

(Original description) The small shell has a fusiform shape. The spire is elevated with a rounded apex. It contains six whorls, slightly convex, with six sharp, slighdy oblique, transverse ribs arranged in slightly twisted lines radiating from the apex. The suture is impressed and distinct. The aperture is narrow, truncated in front, slightly notched behind. The  outer lip is margined. The inner lip is smooth.

Distribution
This extinct marine species was found in Pleistocene strata off San Pedro to San Diego, California, USA.

References

External links
 Worldwide Mollusc Species Data Base : Mangelia branneri
  Dall, William Healey. Summary of the marine shellbearing mollusks of the northwest coast of America: from San Diego, California, to the Polar Sea, mostly contained in the collection of the United States National Museum, with illustrations of hitherto unfigured species. No. 112. Govt. print. off., 1921   

branneri
Gastropods described in 1903